Orbital perturbation may refer to:
Perturbation (astronomy), the classical approach to the many-body problem of astronomy
Orbital perturbation analysis (spacecraft), the activity of determining why a satellite's orbit differs from the mathematical ideal orbit